Enrico Golisciani (25 December 1848 – 6 February 1919) was an Italian author, born in Naples. He is best known for his opera librettos, but also published a slim volume of verses for music, entitled  Pagine d'Album (Milano, Ricordi, 1885); many more of his poems intended to be set to music were published in the Gazzetta Musicale di Milano.

Selected librettos 
Carlo di Borgogna (Pietro Musone – Naples, Teatro Mercadante, 22 March 1876)
Lida Wilson (Ferdinando Bonamici – Pisa, Teatro Nuovo, 31 January 1878)
Il Conte di San Ronano (Nicola De Giosa – Naples, Teatro Bellini, 12 May 1878)
Griselda (Giulio Cottrau – Turin, Teatro Alfieri, 25 September 1878)
Il ritratto di Perla (Cesare Rossi – Naples, Circolo Unione, 7 January 1879)
Sogno d'amore (Cesare Bernardo Bellini – Naples, Casino dell'Unione, 12 January 1880)
I cavalieri di Malta (Antonio Nani) – Valletta, Royal Opera House 16 January 1880)
Nella (Francesco Paolo Frontini – Catania, Teatro Comunale, 31 March 1881)
Rabagas (Nicola De Giosa – Rome, Teatro Argentina, 23 March 1882)
Cordelia dei Neri (Ferdinando Aldieri – La Valletta, Teatro Reale, 9 May 1884)
Marion Delorme (Amilcare Ponchielli – Milan, Teatro alla Scala, 17 March 1885)
Cimbelino (Niccolò van Westerhout – Naples, private performance, December 1887)
Marina (Umberto Giordano – composed in 1888, but not performed)
Gina (Francesco Cilea – Naples, Collegio di musica, 9 February 1889)
Bianca di Nevers (Adolfo Baci – Rovigo, Teatro Sociale, 1 November 1889)
A Santa Lucia (Pierantonio Tasca – Berlin, Kroll Opera House 1892)
Il segreto di Susanna (Ermanno Wolf-Ferrari – Munich, Hoftheater, 4 December 1909)
L'amore medico (Ermanno Wolf-Ferrari – Dresden, Hoftheater, 4 December 1913)

Translations into Italian 
Il pipistrello (Nicola De Giosa – Italian premiere at Naples, Società Filarmonica, 28 January 1875)

Poems set to music
Romances:
Preso a morte, words by E. Golisciani, music by Francesco Paolo Frontini, Maddaloni, 1878
Abbandonata, words by E. Golisciani, music by Francesco Paolo Frontini, Ricordi, 1878
Biglietto amoroso, words by E. Golisciani, music by Francesco Paolo Frontini, Benenati, 1878
Non sei più tu, words by E. Golisciani, music by Francesco Paolo Frontini, Benenati, 1878
 Un fiore sul verone , words by Enrico Golisciani, music by Francesco Paolo Frontini, Ricordi, 1883

References
This article was originally translated from this version of its counterpart in the Italian Wikipedia.

19th-century Italian poets
Italian male poets
Italian opera librettists
1848 births
1919 deaths
19th-century Neapolitan people
Italian male dramatists and playwrights
19th-century Italian dramatists and playwrights
20th-century Italian dramatists and playwrights
19th-century Italian male writers
20th-century Italian male writers